The Yongzhou courthouse shooting occurred on 1 June 2010 when  46-year-old Zhu Jun, armed with a submachine gun and 2 other weapons, entered the Lingling District People's Court in Yongzhou, Hunan and randomly killed 3 judicial workers who happened to be at work at an office on the 4th floor.

Events
On 1 June 2010 just before 10:00am, Zhu Jun entered the courthouse and randomly shot at people. The attack resulted in 3 deaths (presiding judge Zhao Hulin, deputy chief judge Jiang Qidong, and court clerk Huang Lan) and 3 injured persons. The victims were not discussing the case of the assailant. Zhu killed himself after the incident.

Zhu was apparently angry at the Chinese justice system about the results of his divorce settlement. He had a son, and had separated from his wife 3 years previous to the incident.

Zhu worked as the head of security at the Lingling District post office, and had obtained the weapons from post office security personnel by pretending that he needed to take them to be examined.

Censored
News of the attack was subject to internet censorship in the People's Republic of China. The Chinese Government ordered the major news portals to remove mentions of the incident, citing fear of copycat crimes. For example, Baidu's Zhidao page on the incident was taken down.

See also
 2010 Chinese school attacks

References

Suicides in the People's Republic of China
Murder–suicides in China
2010 murders in China
June 2010 crimes
Mass shootings in China